Naya Waters manufactures, under the name Naya, bottled natural spring water, drawn from a spring in the Laurentian Mountains, in southern Quebec, Canada. Naya's natural spring water is bottled directly at this source, and it is untreated and non-ozonized, and naturally sodium-free.

The name Naya comes from the word Naiads, who, in Greek mythology, were the goddesses of thermal waters and the immortal guardians of rivers, fountains and springs.

Since March 2021, Naya Waters returned to being a 100% Québec owned and operated company.

Company history

Naya’s founders searched for five years for a spring with specific qualities and found the Naya spring at the foot of the Laurentians in Mirabel, just north of Montreal. In 1986, the plant was built at the same location so that the water could be bottled as close to the spring as possible.

Since August 1995, NAYA has also operated a water bottling facility in the Selkirk Mountains of Revelstoke, British Columbia, under the same strict standards as its Mirabel facilities.

Naya spring
The Naya spring is located in Mirabel, at the foot of the Laurentian mountains, which contain aquifers that have formed over millions of years. Naya water is drawn from an aquifer located at a depth of over 30 metres deep. Naya spring water is a natural and renewable resource.

Products
 Naya natural spring water: spring water available in various different bottle sizes.
 Naya Zest: spring water-based beverage with natural fruit flavors.
 Naya Mini: spring water in a compact (330ml) bottle.

Environmental commitment
Naya states that it is committed to carbon footprint reduction, and recently introduced bottles made from 100% recycled plastic, also called rPET. This means that used plastic is recycled and utilised in the manufacture of Naya bottles.
, Naya donates 1% of its revenues to the protection of the environment. These funds finance a number of partnerships, such as the one with the Fondation de la faune du Québec, named the "Naya Fund," a fund which aims to improve water quality and aquatic habitats in urban areas, to emphasize aquatic fauna in urban catchment areas, to support a dialogue between municipal, environmental and wildlife experts, and to raise awareness among city dwellers on the importance of protecting urban rivers and streams.

References

External links
Official website

Bottled water brands
Soft drinks
Food and drink companies of Canada
Companies based in Quebec
Mirabel, Quebec